Brighton High School in Cottonwood Heights, Utah is located about  south of Salt Lake City. It serves students in grades 9-12 for the Canyons School District.

Notable alumni
Jackson Barton - NFL offensive tackle
Cody Barton - NFL linebacker
Dani Drews - professional volleyball player and member of U.S. national team.
Simi Fehoko - NFL wide receiver
Bryan Kehl - former NFL linebacker
Reno Mahe - former NFL running back
Sean Overholt - former Chicago Cubs pitcher

References

External links

Canyons School District

Public high schools in Utah
Educational institutions established in 1969
Schools in Salt Lake County, Utah
1969 establishments in Utah